Vladimír Černý (27 April 1926 – 30 October 2016) was a Czechoslovakian modern pentathlete. He competed at the 1956 Summer Olympics.

References

1926 births
2016 deaths
Czechoslovak male modern pentathletes
Olympic modern pentathletes of Czechoslovakia
Modern pentathletes at the 1956 Summer Olympics
Sportspeople from Bratislava